Gustav Alexander Wilhelm Nicolai (28 May 1795 – 21 December 1868) was a Prussian writer and composer.

Career 

Nicolai was born in Berlin to Friederike Sophie Riemer and her husband Carl Friedrich Wilhelm Nicolai, a member of the Ober-Finanzrat (Upper Finance Council) and director of the Prussian maritime trading company. He was educated in the Gymnasium in Königsberg in der Neumark, attending the Gymnasium and receiving instruction from the organist Gracht Unterricht. He returned to Berlin in 1812, spending a short time at the Graues Kloster and receiving piano lessons Johann Philipp Schmidt. In 1813 he fought in the Napoleonic Wars and then studied under Friedrich Wilhelm Berner in Breslau. From 1820 to 1843 he was Divisional Auditor in Berlin, before becoming a private tutor.

His friends included the composers Adolf Bernhard Marx, Gaspare Spontini and Carl Loewe, for whom he wrote the oratorio libretto Die Zerstörung von Jerusalem, set to music by Loewe in 1833. Frederick William III of Prussia rewarded Nicolai with a golden box for the same libretto - the king was one of his main supporters, giving him the Gold Medal for Art and Science.

Nicolai became widely known for his travelogue Italien wie es wirklich ist (Italy as it really is, 1834), in which he gave a critical description of the country. He was heavily criticised, including by Friedrich Wilhelm Gubitz. Nicolai unsuccessfully sued for libel against the review Blätter für literarische Unterhaltung of 1 September 1834 (Nr. 244) - the judgement made legal history, defining the right of literary criticism Between 1835 and 1843 he corresponded with Robert Schumann and wrote several essays for the Neue Zeitschrift für Musik.

Personal life
Nicolai's first marriage was to Henriette Dorothea May and after her death his second was to Leopoldine Concordia Cölestine Grothe (1817 – 11 July 1852). They had four children in 1833, 1834, 1836 and 1837 (who all died in infancy), followed by Arthur Gustav (1845–1846), Leontine Catherine Valerie (1848–1868) and Leontine Rosamunde (born 1850). He died in Berlin.

Publications 
 Die Geweihten, oder der Kantor von Fichtenhagen. Humoreske in zwei Theilen, Berlin: Schlesinger 1829; 2. Aufl. 1846
 Jeremias, der Volkscomponist, eine humoristische Vision aus dem 25sten Jahrhundert, Berlin: Wagenführ 1830
 Italien, wie es wirklich ist. Bericht über eine merkwürdige Reise in den hesperischen Gefilden als Warnungsstimme (für Alle, welche sich dahin sehnen), 2 Bände, Leipzig: Wiegand 1834 – 2. Aufl. 1835 (im Anhang zahlreiche Rezensionen der Erstauflage)
 Band 1 (Digitalisat)
 Band 2 (Digitalisat)
 Neuausgabe der Erstausgabe von 1834, mit Anmerkungen versehen und ergänzt mit zeitgenössischen Kritiken und Dokumenten zum Rechtsstreit wegen Beleidigung. Berlin 2016, .
 Arabesken für Musikfreunde, 2 Bände, Leipzig: Wigand 1835 (Digitalisat)

Selected compositions
 op. 1: Die Sängerfahrt, ballad to a text by Ernst Schulze (1836)
 op. 2: Das Mädchen am Ufer (The Girl on the Shore), ballad after the English (1836)
 op. 3–7: Zwölf Balladen (Twelve Ballads) to a text by Ludwig Uhland (1837)

Bibliography 
 Carl Freiherr von Ledebur, Tonkünstler-Lexicon Berlin’s von den ältesten Zeiten bis auf die Gegenwart, Berlin 1861, S. 396f.
 Martin A. Völker, Wo die Zitronen blühen und die Flöhe beißen – Das Sehnsuchtsland Italien bei Gustav Nicolai (1795–1868) und Eduard Boas (1815–1853), in: Franciszek Grucza (Hrsg.), Akten des XII. internationalen Germanistenkongresses Warschau 2010. Vielheit und Einheit der Germanistik weltweit, Bd. 7, Frankfurt am Main: Lang 2012, S. 185–190
 Briefwechsel Robert und Clara Schumanns mit Korrespondenten in Berlin 1832 bis 1883, edited by Klaus Martin Kopitz, Eva Katharina Klein and Thomas Synofzik (Schumann-Briefedition, Serie II, Band 17), Cologne: Dohr 2015, S. 473–489,

References 
{

External links 
 Genealogy

1795 births
1868 deaths
German travel writers
Writers from Berlin
Prussian Army personnel of the Napoleonic Wars
19th-century German composers
19th-century German male musicians
19th-century German non-fiction writers
19th-century German male writers
German male non-fiction writers
German male composers
German oratorio and passion librettists